Scott Clayton (born 11 February 1994) is a former British tennis player.

Clayton is a doubles specialist who has a career-high doubles ranking of World No. 107 achieved on 16 July 2018. He has also reached a career-high singles ranking of World No. 689 achieved on 17 October 2016. Clayton has reached 46 career doubles finals posting a record of 31 wins and 15 losses, which includes a 4–2 record in ATP Challenger finals.

Clayton made his ATP main draw debut at the 2017 Aegon International Eastbourne on grass courts where he received a wildcard entry ino the doubles draw alongside regular partner and compatriot Jonny O'Mara. They were defeated in the first round in a third set tiebreak by Diego Schwartzman and Jiri Vesely 4–6, 6–3, [7–10].

Grand Slam Appearances 

Clayton made his Grand Slam debut at the 2017 Wimbledon Championships after receiving a wildcard into the doubles main draw with Jonny O'Mara. In the first round they played against Adrian Mannarino and Paolo Lorenzi and while up a set leading the match 7–6(7–5), 3–4 they claimed the victory when the opposition was forced to stop playing and retire. They would go on to lose in the second round to first seeds and eventual semi-finalists John Peers and Henri Kontinen in straight sets 3–6, 4–6, 4–6. 

A similar story line would unfold the following year when again Clayton received a wild card entry into the doubles draw of the 2018 Wimbledon Championships this time partnering Liam Broady. In the first round, they defeated Frances Tiafoe and Jackson Withrow in straight sets 7–5, 6–3, 5–7 before retiring in the second round to Máximo González and Nicolás Jarry while behind 6–7(4–7), 3–6, 2–1.

For a third consecutive year, Clayton received a wild card entry into the doubles draw of the 2019 Wimbledon Championships playing again with Liam Broady, but this year they would be ousted in the first round by Leonardo Mayer and Joao Sousa 6–7(3–7), 6–4, 5–7, 3–6.

ATP Challenger and ITF Futures finals

Doubles: 46 (31–15)

References

External links

1994 births
Living people
British male tennis players
Jersey people
People educated at Millfield